Mitchem is a surname. Notable people with the surname include:

Arnold L. Mitchem, American educator and executive 
Donavan Mitchem (born  1989), American activist
Hinton Mitchem (1938–2013), American politician